Miselaine Duval Vurden is a Mauritian comedian, television producer and writer best known as a cast member of the television series Fami Pa Kontan and Kel Famille. She is the founder of the comedian group Komiko.

Life and career
Miselaine Duval was interested in acting since the age of 12, after completing her studies she started to play various role in TV programs and eventually decided to start her career as a comedian.

Television

See also 
 Fami Pa Kontan

References 

Living people
Mauritian comedians
Mauritian actresses
Mauritian women writers
Year of birth missing (living people)